Dynamics is the branch of classical mechanics that is concerned with the study of forces and their effects on motion. Isaac Newton was the first to formulate the fundamental physical laws that govern dynamics in classical non-relativistic physics, especially his second law of motion.

Principles
Generally speaking, researchers involved in dynamics study how a physical system might develop or alter over time and study the causes of those changes.  In addition,  Newton established the fundamental physical laws which govern dynamics in physics. By studying his system of mechanics, dynamics can be understood. In particular, dynamics is mostly related to Newton's second law of motion. However, all three laws of motion are taken into account because these are interrelated in any given observation or experiment.

Linear and rotational dynamics
The study of dynamics falls under two categories: linear and rotational.  Linear dynamics pertains to objects moving in a line and involves such quantities as force, mass/inertia, displacement (in units of distance), velocity (distance per unit time), acceleration (distance per unit of time squared) and momentum (mass times unit of velocity).  Rotational dynamics pertains to objects that are rotating or moving in a curved path and involves such quantities as torque, moment of inertia/rotational inertia, angular displacement (in radians or less often, degrees), angular velocity (radians per unit time), angular acceleration (radians per unit of time squared) and angular momentum (moment of inertia times unit of angular velocity).  Very often, objects exhibit linear and rotational motion.

For classical electromagnetism,  Maxwell's equations describe the kinematics. The dynamics of classical systems involving both mechanics and electromagnetism are described by the combination of Newton's laws, Maxwell's equations, and the Lorentz force.

Force

From Newton, force can be defined as an exertion or pressure which can cause an object to accelerate. The concept of force is used to describe an influence which causes a free body (object) to accelerate. It can be a push or a pull, which causes an object to change direction, have new velocity, or to deform temporarily or permanently. Generally speaking, force causes an object's state of motion to change.

Newton's laws

Newton described force as the ability to cause a mass to accelerate. His three laws can be summarized as follows:
 First law: If there is no net force on an object, then its velocity is constant: either the object is at rest (if its velocity is equal to zero), or it moves with constant speed in a single direction.
 Second law: The rate of change of linear momentum P of an object is equal to the net force Fnet, i.e., dP/dt = Fnet.
  Third law: When a first body exerts a force F1 on a second body, the second body simultaneously exerts a force F2 = −F1 on the first body. This means that F1 and F2 are equal in magnitude and opposite in direction.

Newton's laws of motion are valid only in an inertial frame of reference.

See also
Statics
Multibody dynamics
Rigid body dynamics
Analytical dynamics

References

Further reading